Kobalt Music Recordings is a division of Kobalt Music Group. KLS provides record label services to artists, receiving a share of revenues, while allowing artists to retain ownership of their master recordings. The company was founded in 2012 when Kobalt acquired digital distributor AWAL. Their roster includes artists such as Chip, Nick Cave & The Bad Seeds, Prince, New Kids on the Block, Pet Shop Boys, Maya Jane Coles, and Travis.

Artists
Band of Horses
Band of Skulls
Best Coast
The Birds of Satan
Blonde Redhead
Boy George
Chip
Maya Jane Coles
Culture Club
The Darkness
De La Soul
Die Antwoord
Dispatch
Markus Feehily
Neil Finn
Sean Forbes
Frank Carter & The Rattlesnakes
David Gray
The Growlers
Eric Hutchinson
Billy Idol
Karen O
Kele
Lenny Kravitz
Lifehouse
Little Boots
Courtney Love
Laura Marling
Richard Marx
Massive Attack
Martina McBride
Brian McKnight
Mint Condition
New Kids on the Block
Nick Cave and the Bad Seeds
Noel Gallagher's High Flying Birds
Pet Shop Boys
Peter Bjorn and John
Placebo
Prince
Duncan Sheik
Steel Panther
Dave Stewart
Joss Stone
Travis
VÉRITÉ
The Voidz
Von Grey
The Waterboys
Wildlife Control
Dan Wilson

Labels
Cash Motto 
Cherry Forever Records
Chrysalis Records
Cult Records
Different Man Music
Ramalamadingdong Recordings Ltd.
Marathon Artists
Mau5trap
Red Telephone Box
HipHop Rex
Sour Mash Records
Painfullyanallymusicentertainment Inc. (USA Only)
Very Me Records
Zoiks Music
Woah Dad!
x2

References

External links
Official site

British independent record labels
Record labels established in 2012